The Mumbai Indians (MI) are a franchise cricket team based in Mumbai, India, which plays in the Indian Premier League (IPL). They were one of the nine teams that took part in the 2012 Indian Premier League. They were captained by Harbhajan Singh who had taken over the captaincy from Sachin Tendulkar.

Mumbai Indians reached the Eliminator of playoff stage in the 2012 IPL where they were defeated by the Chennai Super Kings. They qualified for the 2012 Champions League Twenty20, where they crashed out in the group stage.

Squad
Players with international caps before 2012 IPL are listed in bold.

Indian Premier League

Season standings

Match log

Champions League Twenty20

Group standings

Match log

References

2012 Indian Premier League
Mumbai Indians seasons